The Shipra, also known as the Kshipra, is a river in Madhya Pradesh state of central India. The river rises in the North of Dhar district, and flows north across the Malwa Plateau to join the Chambal River at the MP-Rajasthan boundary in Mandsaur district. It is one of the sacred rivers in Hinduism. The holy city of Ujjain is situated on its east bank. Every 12 years, the Sinhastha fair (Kumbh Mela) takes place on the city's elaborate riverside ghats, as do yearly celebrations of the river goddess Kshipra. There are hundreds of Hindu shrines along the banks of the river Shipra.

Shipra is a perennial river. Earlier there used to be plenty of water in the river. Now the river stops flowing a couple of months after the monsoon.

With this reference, the word Shipra is used as a symbol of "purity" (of soul, emotions, body, etc.) or "chastity" or "clarity".

The Puranas, or ancient Hindu texts, also suggest that the Shipra originated from the heart of Varaha, Lord Vishnu's incarnation as a boar.

Also on the banks of the Shipra is Sage Sandipani’s ashram or hermitage where Lord Krishna, Lord Vishnu's eighth incarnation, had studied.

Narmada Shipra Sihastha Link Pariyojana, Mundla Dosdar - a project linking Shipra river to River Narmada was commenced in 2012 and completed in 2015 successfully. The project lifts water from the Narmada river using electricity, and then transports it to the source of Kshipra river through pipes. The link project is the first phase of Rs 8000-crore Narmada-Malwa Link project. Under the project, Narmada would be connected to Kshipra, Gambhir, Kalisindh and Parwati rivers.

References

External links
Holly Bath in Shipra River Ujjain At Somvarti Amavasya (India News). Published on 5 December 2013.

Geography of Malwa
Rivers of Madhya Pradesh
Geography of Ujjain
Rivers of India